Getting Played is a 2005 American romantic comedy television film directed by David Silberg, starring Vivica A. Fox, Bill Bellamy, Carmen Electra, and Stacey Dash. The film is about three beautiful women, who decide, on a bet, to select and seduce a total stranger.

Plot
The film centers around three very attractive women who, after having many guy troubles themselves, decide to play a prank on a random man.  Their goal is to seduce the man while catching the whole sequence on tape and ultimately humiliating him with the footage.  Their plan runs into some snags, as the man they choose to prank knows what they are trying to do to him.

A man named Mark Sellers (Bill Bellamy) then has sex with Andrea Collins (Vivica A. Fox) and Lauren (Carmen Electra) while they video tape the intercourse, only for him to change both tapes. He then goes on a date with Emily (Stacey Dash) only to fall in love with her after finding that they both have a lot in common and they "look good together". In the end, they admit everything to each other, and after five minutes of begging, disturbing a couple eating dinner who they think that they are on a hidden camera show, decide to forgive each other and start out clean and honest.

Cast
 Vivica A. Fox as Andrea Collins 
 Bill Bellamy as Mark Sellers 
 Carmen Electra as Lauren 
 Stacey Dash as Emily 
 Joe Torry as Josh 
 Dorian Gregory as Darrel 
 Kathy Najimy as Dr. Heidi Z. Klemmer 
 Michael Jai White as Jerome
 Mindy Sterling as Lydia 
 Joseph C. Phillips as Robert Mitchellson 
 Janell Inez as Sharise  	
 Sheryl Underwood as Herself (Comedienne)
 Earthquake as James
 Tichina Arnold as Stephanie
 Larry B. Scott as Dennis

Release
The movie was released on December 10, 2005, in the United States and the DVD was released on June 13, 2006.

External links

Yahoo Profile

2005 films
2005 television films
2005 romantic comedy-drama films
American romantic comedy-drama films
Films set in Los Angeles
Films set in California
New Line Cinema films
2005 directorial debut films
2005 comedy films
2005 drama films
American drama television films
2000s American films